Felix Delgado (born December 18, 1974), better known by his stage name Cuban Link, is a Cuban American rapper and original member of Terror Squad.

Biography
Delgado was born in Havana, Cuba, in 1974. He and his family emigrated to the United States in 1980 during the Mariel boatlift, settling in the South Bronx in New York City. When Delgado was growing up, hip hop music was rising in popularity in his neighborhood. Delgado took on stage name Cuban Link and associated with fellow rappers Big Pun and Triple Seis in a group under the name Full-A-Clips.

Cuban Link and Big Pun both made guest performances on The Beatnuts' single "Off the Books" in 1997. They joined the local rap group Terror Squad, and Link performed on the track "Tell Me What You Want" from the group's self-titled debut album. Link previously did guest appearances on Big Pun's Capital Punishment and Fat Joe's Don Cartagena. Cuban Link was signed to Atlantic and began recording his debut LP 24K. Big Pun died on February 7, 2000, so Cuban Link wrote "Flowers For The Dead" in Pun's honor. However, without Pun's mediation, contract disputes between Fat Joe and Cuban Link and leaks prevented the release of 24K. 24K is now available for digital download on Amazon Music, but has not been released physically. 

In April 2001, during an album release party for Angie Martinez at Jimmy's Bronx Cafe, Cuban Link got in an altercation and had his face slashed when he was trying to break up a fight between Fat Joe and rapper Sunkiss. By that time, Cuban Link left Terror Squad. He released a mixtape, Broken Chains, in 2003 put together by Dren Starr & Roy P. Perez. He joined independent label Men of Business in 2005 and released Chain Reaction. It included singles "Sugar Daddy" (featuring Mýa) and "Scandalous" (featuring Don Omar) and combined some reggaeton sound as well.

It was the largest independent deal ($2MM) for a single album and an unsigned act, at the time and a joint venture with Universal.

Discography

Studio albums
 24K (2000) (Unreleased)
 Chain Reaction (2005)

Collaboration albums
 Terror Squad: The Album with Terror Squad (1999)

References

External links
   Official Instagram

1974 births
Living people
American entertainers of Cuban descent
Atlantic Records artists
Cuban emigrants to the United States
Cuban rappers
Hispanic and Latino American rappers
People from Havana
Rappers from the Bronx
Cuban reggaeton musicians
Terror Squad (group) members
East Coast hip hop musicians
21st-century American rappers